C. W. Miller House is a historic home located adjacent to the campus of Mary Baldwin University at Staunton, Virginia. It was built in 1899–1900, and is a 2 1/2-story, three bay, brick and stone building in a Châteauesque / Romanesque Revival style.  It features four decorated brick chimneys with elaborately corbelled caps, a one-story wraparound porch, and a three-story round tower at the corner of the house.  At one time the house was sold to Mary Baldwin College for the music school, but has since returned to private ownership.

It was added to the National Register of Historic Places in 1979.  It is located in the Stuart Addition Historic District.

References

See also
Hilltop, Main, and Rose Terrace, are other NRHP-listed building on the campus.
 

University and college buildings on the National Register of Historic Places in Virginia
Romanesque Revival architecture in Virginia
Houses completed in 1900
Houses in Staunton, Virginia
Mary Baldwin University
National Register of Historic Places in Staunton, Virginia
Individually listed contributing properties to historic districts on the National Register in Virginia